Aspistomella lobioptera is a species of ulidiidae or picture-winged fly in the genus Aspistomella of the family Ulidiidae.

References

Ulidiidae
Insects described in 1909